Not Human (also known under its working title Ombis: Alien Invasion) is a 2013 American science fiction film written, co-produced, and directed by Adam R. Steigert. The film stars Jason John Beebe and Sara Manzella, and had a premiere screening at the 2013 Scare-A-Con Film Festival.

Plot
In the former industrial town of Metzburgh, a meteorite carrying an extraterrestrial virus known as Ombis lands. Mark Lowe, a teenage resident of the town, and his ex-girlfriend Lucy Greenheart become caught in the crossfire of the virus, which turns humans into disfigured mutants, and Nemesis, an alien from the same planet the virus originated, who was sent to Earth to contain the spread of the infection.

Cast
 Jason John Beebe as Mark Lowe
 Sara Manzella as Lucy Greenheart
 Bob Bozek as Glen
 Debora Manzella as Doctor D 
 Richard Satterwhite as Sheriff Thomas Bracket
 Kathy Murphy as Daisy

References

External links

2013 films
2013 science fiction films
Alien invasions in films
American science fiction films
2010s English-language films
Films directed by Adam R. Steigert
2010s American films